The Battle of Kherlen was a battle between the Northern Yuan and Ming dynasties that took place at the banks of Kherlen River (Kerulen) in the Mongolian Plateau on 23 September 1409.

After Bunyashiri had been crowned with the regnal title of Öljei Temür Khan in 1403, the Yongle Emperor sent an envoy to congratulate him and demand his submission in 1409. Öljei Temür Khan detained the Ming envoy to express he was not willing to join the tributary relationship with the Ming dynasty. The leader Arughtai beheaded another envoy of the Yongle Emperor in the same year and declared his allegiance to the Khagan. The Eastern Mongols had been routed to the Kerulen River by recent attacks of the Oyirad Mongols, thus the Yongle Emperor took the opportunity for a punitive expedition. He sent a force of 1,000 cavalry against the Eastern Mongols.

Lured deep into the Mongolian steppe, the Ming army was completely routed and defeated. The elite Ming General Qiu Fu, with several other commanders, were killed by Arughtai west of Onohu.

In the aftermath of this battle, the Yongle Emperor would personally lead a punitive expedition against the Eastern Mongols, annihilating large proportions of their Mongol forces.

References

Kherlen 1409
Kherlen 1409
Kherlen 1409
1409 in Asia
15th century in China
Wars involving the Northern Yuan dynasty